This is a list of the municipalities in the state of Mato Grosso do Sul (MS), located in the Central-West Region of Brazil. Mato Grosso do Sul is divided into 79 municipalities, which are grouped into 11 microregions, which are grouped into 4 mesoregions.

Note:

* - Figueirão was created on 2005, from parts of Costa Rica and Camapuã. Paraíso das Águas was created as a municipality on 1 January 2013, from parts of the municipalities of Água Clara, Costa Rica and Chapadão do Sul.

See also
Geography of Brazil
List of cities in Brazil

Mato Grosso do Sul